Orata I Love You (also known as Orata) is a 2007 Indian Kannada-language romantic drama film directed by Shri and starring newcomers Prashanth and Sowmya. The film was a box office failure despite being profitable. After this film, Prashanth was referred to as Orata Prashanth.

Cast 
Prashanth as Varada
Sowmya as Kavya 
Harish as Santhosh 
Sathyajith as Gowda
Avinash
Mandya Ramesh
Dhanaraj
Mumaith Khan in an item number

Production 
Hridaya made her debut under the name of Sowmya.

Soundtrack
The soundtrack was composed by newcomer G. R. Shankar. The song "Yaaro Kannalli Kannanittu" from the film became popular.

Reception 
A critic from The Times of India wrote that "Prashanth gives his best and Sowmya is okay. G R Shankar’s music is good". A critic from Rediff.com wrote that "In a nutshell, though Orata I Love You may not be in the same league as Duniya or Mungaru Male, it certainly is a well-made film with good dialogues, decent performances, scintillating music and good choreography". A critic from Chitraloka said that "This story has been told in an interesting manner by Sreenivas. The music by debutant music director B.R.Shankar is the highlight of the film".

Sequel 
Prashanth has written a script for a sequel; however, the film never entered production.

References

External links 
Indiaglitz review